XEJAM-AM (La Voz de la Costa Chica – "The Voice of the Costa Chica") is an indigenous community radio station that broadcasts in Spanish, Mixtec, Amuzgo and Chatino from Santiago Jamiltepec in the Mexican state of Oaxaca. 
It is run by the Cultural Indigenist Broadcasting System (SRCI) of the National Commission for the Development of Indigenous Peoples (CDI).

External links
XEJAM website

References

Amuzgo-language radio stations
Chatino-language radio stations
Indigenous peoples of Oaxaca
Mixtec-language radio stations
Radio stations in Oaxaca
Sistema de Radiodifusoras Culturales Indígenas
Radio stations established in 1994